John Ernest Flood (born 21 October 1932) is an English former professional footballer who played as a winger.

Early and personal life
Flood was born in Southampton. He was one of eight brothers; younger brother Raymond was a first-class cricketer.

Career
Flood was capped as an England schoolboy international.

He joined Southampton from Pennington St. Marks in 1949 and played in the first team from 1952 to 1958, normally as a winger, making 129 appearances in all competitions and scoring 29 goals. His appearances coincided with Southampton's longest spell in Division 3. He later played 17 games in the Football League for Bournemouth, before joining Headington United, where he made 1 appearance in the Southern Football League in August 1959. He finished his career at Cowes.

References

1932 births
Living people
English footballers
Southampton F.C. players
AFC Bournemouth players
Oxford United F.C. players
Cowes Sports F.C. players
English Football League players
Southern Football League players
Association football wingers
Footballers from Southampton